Chauvetia mamillata is a species of sea snail, a marine gastropod mollusk in the family Buccinidae, the true whelks.

Description

Distribution

References

 Arnaud, P. M., 1978. Révision des taxa malacologiques méditerrannéens introduits par Antoine Risso. Annales du Muséum d'Histoire Naturelle de Nice "1977"5: 101-150
 Hergueta E., Luque A.A. & Templado J. (2003). On the taxonomy and biology of the small buccinid gastropod Chauvetia mamillata (Risso, 1826) (Gastropoda: Buccinidae) in South East Spain. Bollettino Malacologico supplemento 4: 135-146

External links
 Risso, A. (1826-1827). Histoire naturelle des principales productions de l'Europe Méridionale et particulièrement de celles des environs de Nice et des Alpes Maritimes. Paris, Levrault:. . 3(XVI): 1-480, 14 pls
 Bucquoy E., Dautzenberg P. & Dollfus G. (1882-1886). Les mollusques marins du Roussillon. Tome Ier. Gastropodes. Paris: Baillière & fils. 570 pp., 66 pls. [pp. 1-84, pls 1-10, 1882; pp. 85-196, pls 11-20, 1883; pp. 197-342, pls 21-40, 1884; pp. 343-418, pls 41-50, 1885; pp. 419-570, pls 51-66

Buccinidae
Gastropods described in 1826